The Pas-Kameesak is a provincial electoral district in the Canadian province of Manitoba that came into effect at the 2019 Manitoba general election. It elects one member to the Legislative Assembly of Manitoba.

The riding was created by the 2018 provincial redistribution out of parts of The Pas, Swan River and Interlake. The riding is named for The Pas the largest community in the riding, and the Cree language word for "big", kameesak, a reference to Lake Winnipeg.

List of provincial representatives

Election results

2019 general election

References

Manitoba provincial electoral districts
The Pas